The Enfield West by-election of 19 November 1970 was held after Conservative Member of Parliament (MP) Iain Macleod died on 20 July of the same year. The seat was retained by the Conservatives.

Results

References

Enfield West by-election
Enfield West by-election
Enfield West,1970
Enfield West,1970
Enfield West by-election